The Howard Thurman House is the historic home of Howard Thurman in Daytona Beach, Florida, United States. It is located at 614 Whitehall Street. Supporters including Reverend Jefferson P. Rogers, a former student of Thurman's at Howard University and tennis champion and activist Arthur Ashe, worked to preserve the house. It was added to the U.S. National Register of Historic Places on February 23, 1990.

References and external links

 Volusia County listings at National Register of Historic Places
 Florida's Office of Cultural and Historical Programs
 Volusia County listings
  Howard Thurman House
 Great Floridians of Daytona Beach

Houses on the National Register of Historic Places in Volusia County, Florida
Buildings and structures in Daytona Beach, Florida